Jáchymov (or Joachimsthal) is a spa town in Karlovy Vary District in the Karlovy Vary Region of the Czech Republic. It has about 2,300 inhabitants. 

The historical core of the town from the 16th century is well preserved and protected by law as urban monument zone. It is a comprehensive set of Gothic–Renaissance patrician houses.

Jáchymov has a long mining tradition, thanks to which it used to be the second most populous town in the Kingdom of Bohemia in 1534. At first silver was mined here. The silver  coins minted here since the 16th century gave their name to the Thaler and the dollar. After the Wieliczka Salt Mine ceased industrial exploitation in 2007, the Svornost mine (1525) became the oldest mine still in use in Europe. It is also the first and for a long time the only mine in the world, where radium was mined. The mining cultural landscape of Jáchymov is a UNESCO World Heritage Site as a part of the Ore Mountain Mining Region.

Administrative parts
Villages of Mariánská, Nové Město, Suchá and Vršek are administrative parts of Jáchymov.

Etymology
The town was founded in a nameless valley called in German just Thal (i.e. "valley"). Later it was named Sankt Joachimsthal after Saint Joachim, meaning "Saint Joachim's Valley". It later developed into the Czech name Jáchymov.

Geography
It lies in the Ore Mountains.

History

In 1512, silver was found in the area. The village of Jáchymov was founded by Štěpán Schlick in 1516 under its German name Joachimsthal. The silver caused the population to grow rapidly, and made the counts Schlick, whose possessions included the town, one of the richest families in Bohemia. In 1528, Ferdinand I seized the right of mining, and the Schlick family lost their profitable business.

Since 1520, the Schlicks had silver coins minted, which were called Joachimsthalers.

The fame of Jáchymov for its ore mining and smelting works attracted the scientific attention of the doctor Georg Bauer (better known by the Latin form of his name, Georgius Agricola) in the late 1527–1531, who based his pioneering metallurgical studies on his observations made here.

In 1534, Jáchymov was the second most populous town in the Kingdom of Bohemia with about 20,000 people.

In 1523, the Protestant Reformation began. In the Schmalkaldic War (1546–47) Jáchymov was occupied for a time by Saxon troops. When in 1621 the Counter-reformation and re-Catholicisation took effect in the town, many Lutheran citizens and people from the mountains migrated to nearby Saxon White Serbia.

Following the Silesian Wars until 1918, the town was in the Austrian part of the Dual Monarchy of Austria-Hungary, head of the district with the same name, one of the 94 Bezirkshauptmannschaften in Bohemia.

In the 19th century the town was also the location of a Court, and of an administrative office responsible for mines and iron production. Mining was still significant in this period. It was run partly by state-owned and partly by privately owned companies. In addition to silver ore (of which in 1885 227 zentners (11.35 tonnes) were produced), nickel, bismuth and uranium ore were also extracted. There were also other industries: an enormous tobacco factory employed 1,000 women. In addition, there was the manufacture of gloves and corks and of bobbin lace. On 31 March 1873 the town almost entirely burnt down.

At the end of the 19th century Maria Skłodowska-Curie discovered in a uraninite spoil dump from Jáchymov, ore containing the element radium, for which she won the Nobel Prize in Chemistry. Until World War I this was the foremost source of radium in the world.

In 1929, Dr Löwy of Prague discovered that "mysterious emanations" in the mine led to a form of cancer. Ventilation and watering measures were introduced, miners were given higher pay and longer vacations, but death rates remained high.

Following the Munich Agreement in 1938, Joachimstal was annexed by Nazi Germany as part of the so-called Sudetenland. Most of the German population was expelled in 1945–1946 (see the Potsdam Agreement) and replaced by Czechs from other parts of the country.

Mining in uranium mines took place here between 1939 and 1964, for nuclear projects of Nazi and Communist facilities. It was proven that the uranium mined here was used in the German nuclear weapons program in their ultimately unsuccessful quest to build a nuclear reactor. In times of Nazi occupation and Communism large prison camps were established in the town and around it. Soviet prisoners of war first worked here, and after 1948 political and other prisoners. Opponents of the new regime (Stalinism) were forced to mine uranium ore under very harsh conditions: the average life expectancy in Jáchymov at this period was 42 years. Uranium mining ceased in 1964.

The mines today (with the exception of Svornost) are no longer in operation and, for example, in the Eduard mine complex there is now a sports complex with a biathlon shooting range. The radioactive thermal springs which arise in the Svornost mine are used under the supervision of doctors for the treatment of patients with nervous and rheumatic disorders. They make use of the constantly produced radioactive gas radon (222Rn) dissolved in the water, see Radon therapy.

Demographics

Spa

In 1864, a spring of radon-rich water was discovered in Jáchymov. The world's first radon spa was founded in Jáchymov in 1906, joining the existing spas of the region such as Karlovy Vary, Františkovy Lázně, and Mariánské Lázně.

The facility offers treatments for a range of medical conditions, based on the controversial theory of radiation hormesis. The treatments offered cover a range of neurological disorders and skin diseases, as well as various musculoskeletal conditions such as osteoarthritis and ankylosing spondylitis. The radon baths are further alleged to improve conditions of patients with diabetes, gout and conditions arising from complications of injuries and operations.

Transport
The Ostrov nad Ohří – Jáchymov railway line was in operation in 1896–1957. Buses now provide regular connections via Ostrov to Karlovy Vary. Since 2005, Jáchymov have one line of town bus transport MHD-1.

Sport
There is several ski lifts, downhill and cross-country trails. The town has the only year-round water park in the Ore Mountains.

Sights

Church of St. Joachim, the first Lutheran church in the Bohemian Kingdom from 1540, after 1624 a Roman Catholic church
Jáchymov Town Hall from 1544
Royal Mint Jáchymov Museum, which now houses the town museum
Church of All Saints, the oldest preserved building in the town (1516)
Holy Trinity Column from 1703
Statue of St. John of Nepomuk is the baroque statue from 1730.
Latin school library – unique library of the Latin school from the 16th century
Schlick Castle – remains of the youngest castle in the Czech Republic
Town and patrician houses are Gothic and Renaissance houses with unique Czech set of portals
Jáchymov pharmacy – the oldest pharmacy in Central Europe from 1520.
Svornost Mine – the first radium mine in the world
Peter's Mill – remains of the oldest watermill in the Czech Republic
Monument to the Discovery of Radium from 1950
Agricola Spa Centre – the oldest spa building, built in 1906–1911
Radium Palace Hotel – Neoclassical spa hotel from 1912

Notable people
Georgius Agricola (1494–1555), town doctor and chemist, the "Father of Mineralogy" 
Johannes Mathesius (1504–1565), German minister and a Lutheran reformer

Twin towns – sister cities

Jáchymov is twinned with:
 Schneeberg, Germany

See also
Kutná Hora – another Bohemian silver mining town

References

External links

Historical photographs 
Historical photographs (portions of the above site in English)

Cities and towns in the Czech Republic
Populated places in Karlovy Vary District
Spa towns in the Czech Republic
Towns in the Ore Mountains
Geological type localities
Mining communities in the Czech Republic
Populated places established in 1516